XHMIG-FM is a radio station on 105.9 FM in San Miguel de Allende, Guanajuato, Mexico. XHMIG carries the news/talk programming of Imagen Radio.

History
XHMIG received its concession on July 27, 1994. It was known as Fantasía 106 and owned by Emilio Nassar Rodríguez, who also owned XHEN-FM in Torreón and XHOZ-FM and XHOE-FM in Querétaro. The four-station group was known as Multimundo.

In 2006, most of Multimundo, except for XHOE, was sold to Imagen and converted to its news/talk format.

References

Radio stations in Guanajuato
Radio stations established in 1994
Grupo Imagen
1994 establishments in Mexico